Keith Allen Butler (born January 30, 1989) is an American former professional baseball pitcher. He played in Major League Baseball (MLB) for the St. Louis Cardinals.

Education
A native of Morgantown, Kentucky, Butler attended Butler County High School and Wabash Valley College. At Wabash he made 20 appearances for the "Warriors", posting a 2.72 ERA with 59 strikeouts and an overall record of 6–2 in 43 innings of work on the mound.

Professional career

Minor leagues
The Cardinals selected Butler in the 24th round of the 2009 MLB draft, the 729th overall selection. Among future Cardinal teammates also taken in the 2009 draft were Trevor Rosenthal, Matt Adams and Matt Carpenter. He split time his first season between the Gulf Coast League Cardinals and the Johnson City Cardinals of the Appalachian League, posting a combined 1–1 record for the season with an ERA of 2.08 and 38 strikeouts over 30 1/3 innings. The performance was good enough to earn honors as The Cardinal Nation/Scout.com Gulf Coast League Cardinals "Reliever of the Year".

Butler spent the entire 2010 season with the Batavia Muckdogs of the New York–Penn League. Despite an 0–3 win/loss record, he led the league's relievers with 14.67 strikeouts per nine innings pitched, notching 50 K's in 30 2/3 innings of work. In 2011 Butler again found himself splitting time between teams. He started the season with the Quad Cities River Bandits, pitching 15 1/3 innings in 12 games allowing just two runs while striking out 16 batters before advancing to the Palm Beach Cardinals. At Palm Beach he shut down opposing offenses, striking out 52 batters and posting a 1.25 ERA as he picked up 17 saves. The numbers earned him post-season honors as the Cardinals 2011 Minors Reliever of the Year by The Cardinal Nation/Scout.com and 2011 Palm Beach Cardinals Relief Pitcher of the Year. After the regular season Butler was chosen by the Cardinals to play in the Arizona Fall League for the Peoria Javelinas

Keith Butler spent the entire 2012 season with the Double-A Springfield Cardinals. He earned Texas League mid-season and post-season All-Star honors. Butler had 25 saves while posting a 5–1 win/loss record and a 2.76 ERA in 53 relief appearances. Following the season Butler was added to the Cardinals' 40 man roster to protect him during the Rule 5 draft.

Major league
The Cardinals promoted Butler to the majors on May 31, 2013. He made his major league debut on June 1 against the San Francisco Giants at Busch Stadium, giving up one hit, one walk, and striking out one in a single inning of work. The next day he pitched a perfect ninth inning for the Cardinals.

Butler was outrighted off the Cardinals roster on November 18, 2014.

References

External links

1989 births
Living people
Baseball players from Kentucky
Major League Baseball pitchers
St. Louis Cardinals players
Wabash Valley Warriors baseball players
Gulf Coast Cardinals players
Johnson City Cardinals players
Batavia Muckdogs players
Quad Cities River Bandits players
Palm Beach Cardinals players
Springfield Cardinals players
Memphis Redbirds players
Sportspeople from Bowling Green, Kentucky
People from Morgantown, Kentucky
Peoria Javelinas players
Leones del Escogido players
American expatriate baseball players in the Dominican Republic